See District  may refer to:
 See District, Fribourg, a district in the canton of Fribourg, Switzerland
 See District, St. Gallen, a former district in the canton of St. Gallen, Switzerland